Italian Grisons or Italian Grigioni, sometimes also called Lombard Grisons, is the region of the Canton of Grisons, Switzerland, in which Italian is the dominant language.

Located in the southernmost part of the canton, it is comprised (from west to east) of the district of Moesa, the municipality of Bregaglia in the district of Maloja and the district of Bernina. It has a population of about 15,000, of which more than 85% speak standard Italian or Lombard. The village and former municipality in Bivio in the district of Albula, located to the north of Bregaglia, once had an Italian-speaking plurality as well. Between 1980 and 1990, however, it was overtaken by German, which is now the majority language of the village.

Geography
The three regions that make up the Italian Grisons are separated by mountains, isolated from the rest of the canton as well as from each other, and from Italy. Because of their remoteness and the lack of economic possibilities, emigration has traditionally been a serious issue, and even today more than half of the people born in the Italian Grisons live and work outside of the region in the predominantly Italian-speaking canton of Ticino.

Religion
Moesa and Bernina are predominantly Roman Catholic, while Bregaglia is chiefly Protestant. Bregaglia is the only municipality in Switzerland with an Italian-speaking Protestant majority.

Education
The dominance of the Italian language in the canton has diminished in recent years, especially to the east in the two regions furthest from Ticino. This is believed to result from migration of German speakers into traditionally Italian-speaking areas, the spread of German language mass media and the absence of secondary schools teaching in Italian in Grisons. The situation is similar to that of Romansh in the canton.

Pro Grigioni Italiano, an organization created in 1918 to promote the Italian language and culture in Grisons, is officially recognized by the cantonal government as representing the indigenous Italian-speaking minority of the canton.

See also
Bernese Jura

References

External links
Voci del Grigioni italiano RSI radio newscast about the Italian Grisons
Pro Grigioni Italiano

Grisons
Regions of Switzerland